The Shapies is an Australian computer-animated children's television series. Produced by Light Knights Productions, it first aired on 6 July 2002, on the Australian Nine Network and, in the United States, on PBS Kids and Animania. The series originally lasted for 26 episodes, with the Series 2 finale airing 30 December 2002.

Background information

The show, which was aimed at four- to eight-year-old children, follows the adventures of the Shapies, a rock band consisting of ten different geometric shapes who have always wanted to be the best band in the whole wide world. They emerge from a toy box into the bedroom of a young boy named Zack. 

The show also consists of musical parts for each character, sung by Robert and Meika Robertson out of Island View Recording Studio in Coffs Harbour. Each one lasts over 2 minutes.

The Episodes in series 1 and 2 were 22–24 minutes without any commercials during the episodes.

The Series 2 episodes were released on iTunes in early of January 2015.

List of characters

 Bob Oblong
The self-proclaimed leader of the band, he's also known as The King of Cool. His best friend is Paul. He has been shown to be scared of ghosts in the episode "Boo!".

Voiced by Tony Bellette.

 Paul the Ball
The silly clown of the band, he laughs a lot and has a ton of energy. His best friend ever is Bob. He gets to "fly" in the episode "Full of Hot Air".

Voiced by Jane U'Brien.

 Tammy Triangle
The athletic member of the band. She argues with Sally a lot. She won a computer game in the episode "Virtual Shapies". She was found in the episode "Another World".

Voiced by Jane U'Brien.

 Rex the Rectangle
The pet of the band.  Always a carefree dog and plays the drums.

Voiced by Jane U'Brien.

 Sarah Circle
The second smartest of the group. Thinks of others and is brave such as in the episode "Wet World".

Voiced by Joey Moore.

 Sally Cylinder
The vain one of the band. Only thinks of her looks and often argues with Tammy, but they repaired their friendship in the episode "Mirror Mirror".

Voiced by Joey Moore.

 Sammy Square
The smartest of the band. Able to come up with ideas, found in the episode "Talent Quest". He saved the bedroom from goo in the episode "The Day The Goo Came!".

Voiced by Jane U'Brien.

 Starry Star
The sweet one of the band. She is timid, but is able to overcome it. Found in the episode "The Amazing Maze". She overcame her fear of heights in the episode "Hanging Around".

Voiced by Jane U'Brien.

 Perry Pyramid
The chilled-out member of the band. He is a gentle giant and the last Shapie to be found. He was found in the episode "X Marks The Spot". He has his first idea in the episode "Mr. Boo to the Rescue".

Voiced by Tony Bellette.

 Connie Cone
The youngest member of the band. She is more quiet than the others. Found in the episode "Circus Day". She befriended Urkel in the episode "The Little Green Men".

Voiced by Joey Moore.

 Mirror Man
Not a Shapie, but a person who appears on the door after Zack leaves, he is the one that guides The Shapies through their adventures.

Voiced by Tony Bellette.

 Mr. Boo
Also not a Shapie, but appears in the second season as the main antagonist.
He is the toy of Zack's cousin, Chad.
His main goal is to get rid of The Shapies, so he can have the bedroom to himself.

As the season progresses, he starts to be more friendly towards The Shapies and everyone else.
In the season finale, "Mr. Boo to the Rescue", he helps The Shapies escape from a box, and earns their friendship before he leaves. However, he stays because Chad gives him to Zack, when he is put in the toy box along with The Shapies, he smiles, thereby he confirms his new-found friendship with The Shapies.

Voiced by Tony Bellette.

 Major Mobile
He is an old toy of the room. He first appears in "Hanging Around", where he believes that the Shapies are his new crew.
In "The Little Green Men", he thinks Urkel the alien is evil.

Voiced by Tony Bellette.

 Zack
The owner of The Shapies and future owner of Mr. Boo; he is a kind boy who likes to hang out with his cousin, Chad.

Voiced by Declan Steele (George Blackley in Season 1).

 Chad
Chad is Zack's cousin and previous owner of Mr. Boo. He only appears in Season 2, where at first, he doesn't think highly of Zack, but as the season progresses, he grows a friendship with him, similar to how Mr. Boo formed a friendship with the Shapies.

At the end of Season 2, his holiday is completed, and he gives Mr. Boo to Zack.

Voiced by Bonnie Fraser.

Main voice actors
 Tony Bellette – Bob Oblong, Perry Pyramid, Mr. Boo, Major Mobile, Gossip The Clock, TV Head, Toot The Train, T-Rex, Big Bot, Mirror Man
 Jane U'Brien – Paul The Ball, Rex The Rectangle, Tammy Triangle, Sammy Square, Starry Star, Dizzy The Top, Uppity, Lauren, Urkel
 Joey Moore (aka Bonnie Moore) – Sarah Circle, Sally Cylinder, Connie Cone, Fair Bear, Zack's Mom, Snooty
 George Blackley – Zack (Season 1)
 Declan Steele – Zack (Season 2)
 Bonnie Fraser – Chad

Series overview

Series 1 episodes
 Bob, Paul, Sarah, Rex, Sally, Tammy, Mirror Man and Zack appear in every episode.
 Sammy is absent from Episodes 1–2.
 Starry is absent from Episodes 1–5.
 Connie is absent from Episodes 1–8.
 Perry is absent from Episodes 1–12.

Series 2 episodes
 Every Shapie makes an appearance in every episode.
 This series marks the first appearances of Mr. Boo and Urkel.

References

External links 
 
 Light Knights Productions home page

Australian children's animated action television series
Australian children's animated adventure television series
Australian children's animated comedy television series
Australian children's animated drama television series
Australian children's animated education television series
Nine Network original programming
2002 Australian television series debuts
2002 Australian television series endings
2000s Australian animated television series
PBS Kids shows
Australian computer-animated television series